Mt. Olivet Baptist Church in Portland, Oregon is listed on the National Register of Historic Places. 
It is at 1734 NE 1st Avenue and was added to the National Register of Historic Places on February 23, 2022.

See also
 National Register of Historic Places listings in Northeast Portland, Oregon
 H. C. Keck House

References

Churches in Portland, Oregon
National Register of Historic Places in Portland, Oregon
African-American history in Portland, Oregon